The Harold Florsheim House is a historic house at 650 Sheridan Road in Highland Park, Illinois. The house was built in 1925–28 for businessman Harold M. Florsheim, who later became the president of Florsheim Shoes. Chicago architect Ernest Grunsfeld, who went on to design the Adler Planetarium, designed the house in the French Chateau style. The house includes a gable above the entrance, a multi-story three-sided bay window, casement windows, and a hip roof broken by dormers. Landscape architect Jens Jensen designed the house's grounds, making use of a ravine on the property to instill a sense of privacy.

The house was added to the National Register of Historic Places on September 29, 1982.

References

National Register of Historic Places in Lake County, Illinois
Houses on the National Register of Historic Places in Illinois
Châteauesque architecture in the United States
Houses completed in 1928
Highland Park, Illinois